"In the Icebound Hothouse" is a short story by American writer William Goyen, originally published in 1985. It is included in the anthology American Gothic Tales edited by Joyce Carol Oates'.

Plot summary 

The story features a poet who seems to be growing mad and nearing insanity. He has lost his inspiration for poetry until, that is, he discovers the hothouse. He talks of a naked girl and a drunken nurseryman who both haunt his mind. He wonders how a person who tends to green plants and spend his days in a room full of life be such a drunk. Plants are peaceful and not intended to be cared for by people so dark and clumsy. The nurseryman haunts the madman. The man wants nothing more than to enter into the hothouse and be safe from the cold.  Not only is the hothouse bounded by ice, with no way to get in, but the mans heart has also grown cold with no way to fill in the hole in his chest. All the man wants is to feel wanted. For days the nurseryman would not let him in. From outside, the man can see wonderful colors filling up the hothouse. Contrary to the outside, all frozen, cold, and colorless. The man tries to get the nurseryman to let him in but he never does. The man becomes very enraged and feels very unwanted. suddenly, he sees a figure fall from the top of the biology lab that rose above the hothouse. The figure smashed right through the frozen glass of the hothouse. The pressure from the smash magically opened the door, so naturally the man waiting outside walked in. The man walked over the figure and saw a naked girl. She had long black hair and just a bit of blood coming from the corner of her mouth. The man wondered why she had jumped, if she have been pushed, and why was she naked. Next thing he knew, the nurseryman latched onto her and began rolling and tumbling over the naked girl.  Then both of the bodies lay there almost as one and seemingly dead. The madman sits next to them and takes out the nurseryman's heart.  Then the bodies are taken out and the madman returns to wherever he came from.

References

External links 
 Amazon, American Gothic Tales
 Celestial Timepiece - A Joyce Carol Oates Home Page - American Gothic Tales
The Paris Review interview
 William Goyen Collection at the Harry Ransom Center at the University of Texas at Austin

American short stories
Gothic short stories
1985 short stories